Pilot Butte is a lava dome that was created from an extinct volcano located in Bend, Oregon. Bend is one of six cities in the United States to have a volcano within its boundaries. The other examples are Mount Tabor in Portland, Oregon, Jackson Volcano in Jackson, Mississippi, Diamond Head in Honolulu, Glassford Hill in Prescott Valley and Pilot Knob in Austin, Texas.

The  Pilot Butte State Scenic Viewpoint, presented as a gift to the State of Oregon in 1928, is a Bend icon. There is also a  trail around the base of the butte. A scenic road also winds up and around the cone. In 2018, the park was the most visited Oregon state park east of the Cascade Mountains. From the top, the entire city of Bend is visible, as well as several major Cascade peaks. The City of Bend launches Fourth of July fireworks from Pilot Butte each year.

Geology 
Pilot Butte formed approximately 188,000 years ago from the eruption of a volcanic vent. The rock has normal magnetic polarity, implying that it was laid down after the most recent geomagnetic reversal about 780,000 years ago. The butte's light-colored soil contains some ash from the eruption of Mount Mazama (which formed Crater Lake).

Ecology 
The most common tree on Pilot Butte is Western juniper, which is sometimes parasitized by witches' broom mistletoe. Also abundant are sagebrush and the similar plants bitterbrush and rabbitbrush. The invasive species cheatgrass is likely the most common grass on the butte. Wildflowers that appear include sand lily, rock cress, penstemon, paintbrush, buckwheat, yarrow, blazing star, mariposa lily, lupine, and monkeyflower. Ponderosa pine and red currant can also be found. Birds and deer feed on some of the plants, and some animals use snags as shelter.

History 
Pilot Butte was named in 1851 by Thomas Clark, leader of the first party of European settlers to camp on the future site of Bend. The Clark wagon train approached the area from the east after recovering from the Clark massacre.

The butte was gifted to State of Oregon as a public park in 1928 by the daughter of Terrence Hardington Foley, the leader of the local Elks lodge until his death in a 1926 automobile accident, to whom the park is dedicated on a memorial tablet. 

In 1983, a drive-in hamburger restaurant called Pilot Butte Drive-In was opened next to the butte on Greenwood Avenue. It remained open until 2020, when it was closed in response to COVID-19 lockdowns. The property was sold and later reopened as a pizza, beer, and poker establishment, known as the Pilot Butte Taproom or the Bend Poker Room.

In 2010, a  trail was constructed around the base of the butte. The park had 949,968 annual visits in 2018, making it the most visited Oregon State Park east of the Cascade Mountains and the ninth most popular in the state.

Gallery

References

External links 

 
 
 
 Pilot Butte State Scenic Viewpoint, from The Oregon Encyclopedia

1928 establishments in Oregon
Bend, Oregon
Buttes of Oregon
Cascade Range
Cascade Volcanoes
Cinder cones of the United States
Extinct volcanoes
Mountains of Deschutes County, Oregon
Mountains of Oregon
Municipal parks in Oregon
Parks in Deschutes County, Oregon
Pleistocene volcanoes
State parks of Oregon
Tourist attractions in Bend, Oregon
Volcanoes of Deschutes County, Oregon
Volcanoes of Oregon

de:Pilot Butte State Scenic Viewpoint